Vacations (Spanish: Vacaciones) is a 1947 Argentine film.

Cast

 Mecha Ortiz as Estela Arenal
 Francisco Martínez Allende as Juan
 Amalia Sánchez Ariño as Antonia
 Maruja Gil Quesada as Laura
 Manuel Collado Montes as Rómulo
 Juan Carlos Altavista as Juan Gabriel Arenal
 Luis Zaballa as Perico Arenal
 Susana Canales as Mercedes
 Ricardo Duggan as	Santiago
 Lilian Valmar as María Laura
 Leticia Scury as Filomena
 Norma Giménez as Ana María
 Jesús Pampín as Andrés
 Francisco Audenino

External links
 

1947 films
1940s Spanish-language films
Argentine black-and-white films
Argentine romantic drama films
1947 romantic drama films
1940s Argentine films